Lorenzo Crounse (January 27, 1834May 13, 1909) was a Nebraska Republican politician and the eighth Governor of Nebraska.

Early life

Born in Sharon in Schoharie County, New York, Crounse attended the New York Conference seminary in Charlotteville, New York.  While teaching school, he studied law and in 1857 he was admitted to the bar. In 1860, he married Mary E. Griffiths and they had four children.

Career
Crounse established a law practice at Fort Plain, New York.  During the Civil War he organized Battery K, New York Light Artillery and became a captain in 1861, served for a year; but was discharged after suffering wounds at a battle on the Rappahannock River in Virginia and resumed his law practice.

Crounse moved to the Nebraska Territory in 1864, and became part of the territorial legislature and later was a delegate to the state's constitutional convention.  He became a Justice of Nebraska state supreme court from 1867 to 1873, and after his term expired, ran and was elected as a Republican to the Forty-third and Forty-fourth Congresses (1873–1877). He declined to run again in 1876.

He became an internal revenue collector for the district of Nebraska in 1879, and then was appointed Assistant Secretary of the United States Treasury on April 27, 1891. He resigned on October 31, 1892 to become the 8th governor of Nebraska. During his term, future Nebraska representative William E. Andrews worked as his private secretary.  He served until 1895, and then served briefly in the Nebraska state senate in 1901.

Death and legacy
After his wife, Mary E. Griffiths Crounse (1836-1882) died, Crounse remained a widower, and he spent his last years with one of his four children. He died in Omaha. The now-extinct village of Crounse, Nebraska, near Lincoln was named after him.

References

External links
 papers at the Nebraska State Historical Society. Retrieved on 2009-07-06.
 Biographical Directory of the United States Congress
National Governors Association
Semi-Centennial History of Nebraska

1834 births
1909 deaths
19th-century American politicians
Republican Party governors of Nebraska
Members of the Nebraska Territorial Legislature
Republican Party Nebraska state senators
Justices of the Nebraska Supreme Court
New York (state) lawyers
American Lutherans
People from Fort Plain, New York
People from Schoharie County, New York
People of New York (state) in the American Civil War
Republican Party members of the United States House of Representatives from Nebraska
Union Army soldiers
United States Assistant Secretaries of the Treasury
19th-century American judges
19th-century Lutherans